Chi La Sow  is a 2018 Indian romantic film directed by Rahul Ravindran. It stars Sushanth and Ruhani Sharma in the lead roles, marking the latter's debut in Telugu. Noted playback singer Chinmayi, wife of Rahul Ravindran, lent her voice for Ruhani Sharma. It is produced by Siruni Cine Corporation and presented by Annapurna Studios.

Plot 

Arjun (Sushanth) is a bachelor who does not want to get married. He proudly claims to be a fan of Salman Khan and a devotee of Lord Hanuman. He is constantly pressured by his parents (Anu Hasan and Sanjay Swaroop) to get married, and his best friend Sujit (Vennela Kishore) joins forces with his parents to get him married. However, Arjun's mom manages to reach an agreement with him. While in a conversation with Sujit, he shares the goals that he would like to fulfill before settling down: to own a sports car and to go on a trip to Europe alone. Another reason he fears marriage is because he has failed in love once. Who used to miss him.

Finally, his mother sets him up on a blind date with a traditional woman named Anjali (Ruhani Sharma) one night. Arjun confesses his disinterest in the matchmaking efforts and Anjali expresses anger towards him and mentions her mother. Arjun asks about her mother and Anjali tells her mother's story.

After the death of her father, her mother Latha (Rohini) became depressed and developed bipolar disorder, which makes her extremely emotional whenever she is happy or sad. Anjali stays with her mother, her sister Anu (Vidyullekha Raman) and her grandmother, and Anjali is the sole breadwinner in her family. Her maternal uncle (Jayaprakash) lives in Vijayawada and checks in on their well-being regularly. Being rejected by various grooms because of her mother's disorder, Latha sank further into depression and tried to commit suicide, thinking that she had become a burden to her daughters. After a hard struggle, Anjali stopped her mother and decided to accept the proposal of any groom who likes her.

After hearing this, Arjun sympathizes with her. Later, they talk about their interests and past matchmaking experiences. Then, Anjali waves goodbye to Arjun but is still bothered about her mother. Arjun consoles her. When Anjali is about to leave, Arjun stops her and expresses his wishes to meet her again. She denies his request and asks him if he will say yes or no to the marriage. Arjun is confused but says yes to the marriage. However, Anjali denies his proposal, deciding that he is too childish and immature.

Meanwhile, at Anjali's home, Latha is hospitalized due to abnormal blood pressure. In a frenzy, everyone goes to the hospital and forgets to lock the door. A delivery boy enters their home to rob it, but finds himself trapped when the door is suddenly locked. Meanwhile, Anjali learns about her mother's condition and decides to head to the hospital. Arjun drops her at the hospital and in the process he forgets his phone. In the hospital, Anjali's family thinks the match has been successful. Then, the situation spirals out of hand when Anjali warns Arjun to leave or else they may misunderstand him. Later, Anjali needs to go home to pick up the insurance card to pay the hospital bills. She has no choice but to take up Arjun's offer to drop her at home. After having dinner at a street food corner, they both go to Anjali's home. There the fearful delivery boy attacks Arjun, making him lose consciousness. While trying to escape, Anjali catches him. Meanwhile, Arjun regains consciousness and the alerted neighbors come to stop her. As the delivery boy attempts to escape, the fearful Anjali injures him on his head. Thinking that the boy had been killed, both of them fear the consequences.

Meanwhile, the neighbors call the cops. A sub-inspector (Rahul Ramakrishna) takes them into custody. Later the sub-inspector learns that the delivery boy is a brother-in-law to one of his constables (Harish Koyalagundla). During the interrogation, Anjali tells the truth but Arjun claims himself to be the killer but that he killed to protect her. After some comical circumstances, the sub-inspector learns that the boy is alive and escaped from the ambulance while on its way to the hospital. He uses the circumstance to his advantage, demanding a bribe from them so that they are not convicted of murder. Arjun is ready to give his entire savings of 12 lakhs, which he saved to fulfill his dreams, when suddenly the constable enters the station happily, declaring that his brother-in-law was alive. Both Arjun and Anjali are released. Anjali is touched by his actions and is falling for Arjun.

Later, they return to the hospital, where Anjali's grandmother is ill from not having proper sleep. Arjun goes to Sujit's home to get an orange juice at 2 am. Meanwhile, the restless Sujit is trying hard to sleep after hearing severe taunts by Arjun's mother. Then, Arjun disturbs him and forces him to get the orange juice. Sujit has a mishap with his neighbor but successfully gets the orange juice. Meanwhile, Anjali is disappointed about the sudden disappearance of Arjun and, in a conversation with her grandmother, she decides to not be emotionally dependent on anybody.

Soon after, Arjun returns with orange juice along with restless and distressed Sujit. Anjali's uncle comes to take a look at his sister's condition. There he meets Arjun and shares Anjali's past. He tells Arjun that Anjali is an independent, confident and mature girl. After her father's death and as the elder daughter, she took on the responsibility of taking care of the family at the age of 14 and started taking tuition for lower grades. Her uncle was unable to take care of the family because of his financial position and he told her about his circumstances. However, Anjali faced the situation confidently and took it positively. Later, when he was in a good position and ready to take care of Anjali and her family, Anjali politely declined his support and continued taking on the responsibilities. After hearing this, Arjun feels strongly towards Anjali and confidently decides he wants to marry her.

Latha gains consciousness and everyone visits her. She recognizes Arjun and is happy to hear that the matrimonial match has been fixed. Later, in private, she confides to Arjun that she will not become a burden to them and that she will leave them after their marriage, but Arjun makes her comfort and builds up her confidence, through his words by saying she was Anjali's strength and will not be a burden to him or his family.

Later, Anjali is impressed with Arjun after seeing him with her mother. After some comical elements at Anjali's home, Anjali confesses her feelings for him. Then, Arjun proposes to her and Anjali accepts the proposal. Arjun takes her to the temple to get married immediately, but Anjali tries to restrain him from making a hasty decision, although inside she is happy to be getting married. Finally, they get married in the temple.

Meanwhile, in the hospital, the sleepy Sujit falls asleep in ICU, and the doctors mistake him for a patient and start a treatment on him. He suddenly wakes up and runs away from the hospital. Arjun's parents faint after learning of Arjun's sudden and shocking decision. Later Arjun's and Anjali's families are happy about their decision and they get married again. The film ends with Arjun fulfilling his dreams along with his wife Anjali.

Cast 

 Sushanth as Arjun
 Ruhani Sharma as Anjali (Voice dubbed by Chinmayi)
 Vennela Kishore as Sujith
 Anu Hasan as Arjun's mother
 Rohini as Latha, Anjali's mother
 Vidyullekha Raman as Anu, Anjali's sister
 Jayaprakash as Anjali's uncle
 Sanjay Swaroop as Arjun's father
 Rahul Ramakrishna as a police officer
 Harish Koyalagundla as a police constable

Music
The score was composed by Prashanth R Vihari, with all songs penned by Kittu Vissapragada except Mellaga Mellaga, which was written by Sri Sai Kiran.

Reception

The New Indian Express rated it 3/5, stating: "The idea of a guy falling for and deciding to marry a girl in just a few hours that he spends with her might sound crazy."

Times of India rated it 3/5, stating: "For those looking for entertainment as understood today, this may not be the film."

India Today rated it 3/5, stating: "Chi La Sow is not a film that will impress you from the first frame. As the story progresses, you end up falling in love with the characters; you can't help it."

Deccan Chronicle rated it 3/5, stating: "After trying his hand at a few commercial films, Sushanth tries a different role with this movie and does full justice to his character Arjun."

The NEWS Minute stated: "This is a clean movie that appeals to urban sensibilities, with a story panning out across one night."

Awards and nominations

References

External links

2018 films
2018 romantic comedy films
2010s Telugu-language films
Indian romantic comedy films
Films whose writer won the Best Original Screenplay National Film Award
2018 directorial debut films